= Odontostyles =

Odontostyles can refer to:

- Odontostyles Breda 1827, a taxonomic synonym for the plant genus Bulbophyllum
- more than one odontostyle; a hollow, protrusible, needle-like tooth found in nematodes, used to puncture and empty food items
